The 2018 edition of the European Men's and Women's Team Badminton Championships was held in Kazan, Russia, from 13 to 18 February 2018. This tournament also served as European qualification for the 2018 Thomas & Uber Cup.

Medalists

Tournament
The 2018 European Men's and Women's Team Badminton Championships officially crowned the best male and female national teams in Europe and at the same time worked as the European qualification event towards the 2018 Thomas & Uber Cup finals. 53 teams consisting of 29 men's team and 24 women's team entered the tournament.

Venue
This tournament was held at Gymnastics Center in Kazan, Russia.

Seeds
The defending Champions, Denmark, were top seeded for both men's and women's team, while the host country Russia were seeded four.

 Men's team

 Denmark 
 England 
 Germany 
 Russia 
 France 
 Poland 
 Finland 

 Women's team

 Denmark 
 Spain 
 Germany 
 Russia 
 Bulgaria 
 England

Draw
The draw was held on 5 December 2017, at the Badminton Europe office in Brøndby, Denmark. The men's team group stage consisted of six groups with four teams in each and one group with five teams. The women's team group stage consisted of six groups with four teams in each.

 Men's team

 Women's team

Men's team

Format
In each group, teams played each other once. The seven group winners and the best runners-up qualified for the knockout stage.

Groups

Group 1

Denmark vs. Israel

Croatia vs. Ireland

Denmark vs. Croatia

Israel vs. Ireland

Denmark vs. Ireland

Israel vs. Croatia

Group 2

England vs. Hungary

Slovakia vs. Greenland

England vs. Slovakia

Hungary vs. Greenland

England vs. Greenland

Hungary vs. Slovakia

Group 3

Germany vs. Iceland

Luxembourg vs. Azerbaijan

Germany vs. Luxembourg

Iceland vs. Azerbaijan

Germany vs. Azerbaijan

Iceland vs. Luxembourg

Group 4

Russia vs. Bulgaria

Spain vs. Belgium

Russia vs. Spain

Bulgaria vs. Belgium

Russia vs. Belgium

Bulgaria vs. Spain

Group 5

France vs. Ukraine

Austria vs. Lithuania

Ukraine vs. Lithuania

France vs. Austria

France vs. Lithuania

Ukraine vs. Austria

Group 6

Portugal vs. Czech Republic

Poland vs. Italy

Poland vs. Portugal

Italy vs. Czech Republic

Poland vs. Czech Republic

Italy vs. Portugal

Group 7

Finland vs. Estonia

Norway vs. Turkey

Finland vs. Norway

Estonia vs. Latvia

Finland vs. Turkey

Norway vs. Latvia

Estonia vs. Norway

Turkey vs. Latvia

Finland vs. Latvia

Estonia vs. Turkey

Ranking of second-placed teams

Knockout stage

Quarterfinals

Semifinals

Final

Women's team

Format
In each group, teams played each other once. The six group winners and the two best runners-up qualified for the knockout stage.

Groups

Group 1

Denmark vs. Sweden

Israel vs. Iceland

Denmark vs. Israel

Sweden vs. Iceland

Denmark vs. Iceland

Sweden vs. Israel

Group 2

Spain vs. Hungary

Portugal vs. Slovakia

Spain vs. Portugal

Hungary vs. Slovakia

Spain vs. Slovakia

Hungary vs. Portugal

Group 3

Ukraine vs. Ireland

Germany vs. Lithuania

Germany vs. Ukraine

Lithuania vs. Ireland

Germany vs. Ireland

Lithuania vs. Ukraine

Group 4

Russia vs. Turkey

Estonia vs. Latvia

Turkey vs. Latvia

Russia vs. Estonia

Russia vs. Latvia

Turkey vs. Estonia

Group 5

Greenland vs. Belarus

Bulgaria vs. France

Bulgaria vs. Greenland

France vs. Belarus

Bulgaria vs. Belarus

France vs. Greenland

Group 6

England vs. Norway

Czech Republic vs. Poland

England vs. Czech Republic

Norway vs. Poland

England vs. Poland

Norway vs. Czech Republic

Ranking of second-placed teams

Knockout stage

Quarterfinals

Semifinals

Final

References

External links
 European Men's & Women's Team Championships
 Invitation 2018 European Men's & Women's Team Championships

European Men's and Women's Team Badminton Championships
European Men's and Women's Team Badminton Championships
Badminton tournaments in Russia
European Men's and Women's Team Badminton Championships
Sport in Kazan
21st century in Kazan
European Men's and Women's Team Badminton Championships